Roy Thompson (18 February 1905 – 1 June 1981) was  a former Australian rules footballer who played with Footscray in the Victorian Football League (VFL).

See also
 1927 Melbourne Carnival

Notes

External links 
		

1905 births
1981 deaths
Australian rules footballers from Victoria (Australia)
Western Bulldogs players